The 1988–89 Winnipeg Jets season saw the Jets finish in fifth place in the Smythe Division with a record of 26 wins, 42 losses, and 12 ties for 64 points, missing the playoffs for the first time since 1981.

Off-season
After two seasons of leading the Jets into the playoffs, the club re-signed head coach Don Maloney to a contract extension through the 1990–91 season on May 16, 1988. At the 1988 NHL Entry Draft held on June 11, 1988, the Jets selected forward Teemu Selanne with their first round draft pick, tenth overall. Selanne spent the 1987–88 playing with Jokerit's junior hockey team, where in 33 games, he recorded 43 goals and 66 points.

On June 13, 1988, the Jets acquired Brent Ashton from the Detroit Red Wings in exchange for Paul MacLean. Ashton had 26 goals and 53 points in 73 games with the Red Wings in 1987–88. MacLean, who had been with Winnipeg since the 1981–82 season, had 40 goals and 79 points in 77 games. In total, MacLean broke the 40-goal plateau three times as a member with the Jets.

On July 19, 1988, Winnipeg made a trade with the New Jersey Devils, acquiring goaltender Alain Chevrier and the Devils' seventh-round pick in the 1989 NHL Entry Draft for Steve Rooney and the Jets' third-round pick in the 1990 NHL Entry Draft. Chevrier had a record of 18–19–3 with a 3.77 goals against average (GAA) in 45 games with the Devils in 1987–88, while Steve Rooney had 7 goals and 13 points, along with 217 penalty minutes, in 56 games with the Jets in 1987–88.

Late in training camp, on September 29, 1988, the Jets acquired Kent Carlson and the St. Louis Blues' tenth-round pick in the 1989 NHL Entry Draft and fourth-round pick in the 1990 NHL Entry Draft for Peter Douris. Carlson would then be traded one week into the 1988–89 season to the Washington Capitals. On October 3, 1988, the Jets picked Dave Hunter from the Edmonton Oilers in the NHL Waiver Draft.  Hunter split the 1987–88 season between the Oilers and Pittsburgh Penguins, scoring 14 goals and 35 points in 80 games.

Regular season
 January 13, 1989: In a victory over the Vancouver Canucks, Jets goaltender Eldon Reddick became the first goaltender in NHL history to not register a shutout in the first 100 games of his career.

Despite finishing last in goals allowed (355) in the NHL, the Jets had the NHL's fifth-best power-play percentage (22.13%).

Final standings

Schedule and results

Playoffs
The Jets missed the playoffs, the first time since the 1980–81 season.

Player statistics

Regular season
Scoring

Goaltending

Awards and records

Transactions

Trades

Waivers

Free agents

Draft picks
The Jets selected the following players at the 1988 NHL Entry Draft, which was held at the Montreal Forum in Montreal, Quebec, on June 11, 1988.

NHL Amateur Draft

NHL Supplemental Draft
Winnipeg selected one player at the 1988 NHL Supplemental Draft.

Farm teams

References

Winnipeg Jets season, 1988-89
Winnipeg Jets (1972–1996) seasons
Winn